The 1992 City of Glasgow District Council election for the City of Glasgow District Council took place in May 1992, alongside elections to the councils of Scotland's various other districts.

Aggregate results

Ward results

See also
1995 South Lanarkshire Council election#Rutherglen and Cambuslang

References

1992
1992 Scottish local elections